Marie-Joseph Antoine Jean-Victor Hocquard (17 January 1910 – 21 December 1995) was a French musicologist, and a specialist of Mozart.

Biography 
Hocquard was born in Obernai. He graduated from Metz high school and obtained his philosophy degree in Nancy. He was successively professor at Wissembourg, Sélestat and Sarreguemines. During the war, he served on the Maginot line. Imprisoned, released, re-imprisoned, he escaped from Metz at Christmas 1940. After the war, he was a professor of philosophy at the Grenoble, Tournon, Tanger and Altkirch high schools.

He passed a Doctorate of Arts from the University of Paris in 1956. His thesis was devoted to La pensée de Mozart partially published two years later at Éditions du Seuil, with a small book from the "Solfèges" series, reprinted since 1964 during its fourth reprint and in 1970 for the second edition, and then reprinted regularly.

He taught philosophy, but devoted most of his energy to deepening the knowledge of the Viennese musician. His name is considered to be "inseparable from Mozart's.", even more than Alfred Einstein, Jean and Brigitte Massin. These authors having dealt with other studies in Beethoven or Schubert for example, Jean-Victor Hocquard in about ten books, has invested himself entirely in Mozart.

From his thesis, he maintained throughout his various studies, the idea that Mozart's specificity resides in a thought of "intrinsically musical character", going even went so far as to consider Mozart as an initiatory guide who, through aesthetic ideals, "would make his music a work of "truth". To do this, he first dismantled the "interpretative overloads" accumulated on the person and the Mozartian work.

Hocquard died in Saint-Avertin in 1995, aged 85.

Works

Books 
 La pensée de Mozart, Seuil, 1958 ; rééd. 1991, 740 p. . The book is dedicated in homage to Henri Davenson and in memory of Georges de Saint-Foix, biographer of Mozart.
 
 
 Écrits et propos du Mozart, 1988
 Mozart, l'unique, Séguier, 1989
 Mozart dans ses airs de concerts, Séguier, 1989
 Mozart de l'ombre à la lumière, Lattès/Archimbaud, 1993 
 Les opéras de Mozart, Les Belles Lettres/Archimbaud, 1995, 971 p. ,  Reprend les parutions suivantes :
 Les Noces de Figaro, series Les grands opéras de Mozart, 1979 
 Don Giovanni, series Les grands opéras de Mozart, Aubier Montaigne, 1978
 Cosi Fan Tutte, series Les grands opéras de Mozart, Aubier Montaigne, 1978
 
 La Clémence de Titus and youth operas, series Les grands opéras de Mozart, Aubier Montaigne, 1986
 L'enlèvement au sérail, series Les grands opéras de Mozart, Aubier Montaigne, 1980
 Idoménée, series Les grands opéras de Mozart, Aubier Montaigne, 1982 
 Mozart, Musique de vérité, Les Belles Lettres/Archimbaud, 1996
 Mozart, ou, La Voix du Comique, 1999

Recording notes 
 Mozart, Cosi Fan Tutte – Elisabeth Schwarzkopf, Nan Merriman, Léopold Simoneau, Rolando Panerai, Lisa Otto, Sesto Bruscantini, Choir and orchestra Philharmonia, conducted by Herbert von Karajan, EMI (1981).
 Mozart, Les Noces de Figaro – Elisabeth Schwarzkopf, George London, Irmgard Seefried, Erich Kunz, Sena Jurinac, Elisabeth Höngen, Chœur de l'Opéra de Vienne, Vienna Philharmonic, conducted by Herbert von Karajan, EMI
 Mozart, Don Giovanni – Choirs and orchestra Philharmonia, conducted by Carlo Maria Giulini, EMI (1983)
 Mozart, Piano concertos 5 and 6 / Rondo K. 382 – Mitsuko Uchida, English Chamber Orchestra, conducted by Jeffrey Tate, Philips (1991)
 Mozart, Piano concertos 8 and 9 – Mitsuko Uchida, English Chamber Orchestra, conducted by Jeffrey Tate, Philips (1992)
 Mozart, piano concertos 11 and 12 – Mitsuko Uchida, English Chamber Orchestra, conducted by Jeffrey Tate, Philips (1990)
 Mozart, Piano concertos 13 and 14 – Mitsuko Uchida, English Chamber Orchestra, conducted by Jeffrey Tate, Philips 422 359-1 (1988)
 Mozart, Piano sonatas K. 282, 310 & 545 – Sviatoslav Richter, piano (Philips 1990)
 Mozart, Don Giovanni, Dramma Giocoso, K. 527 - Colin Davis, Philips 422 541-2 (1991)
 Mozart, Le Nozze Di Figaro, Opera buffa, K. 492 - BBC Symphony Orchestra, conducted by Colin Davis, Philips 422 540-2 (1991)

Articles and forewords 

 "La finta giardiniera, commentaire musical et littéraire", L'Avant-scène Opéra.
 " Mithridate, commentaire musical et littéraire", L'Avant-scène Opéra, 1983.
 "L'enlèvement au Sérail, commentaire musical et littéraire", L'Avant-scène Opéra, 1991
 .

Prefaces
 Le concerto pour piano dans l'œuvre mozartienne, (pp. 9–18), in 
 Alexander Ulybyshev, Mozart, Paris, Séguier, 1991 ,

Bibliography 
 Timothée Picard, "Hocquard, Jean-Victor", in

References

External links 
 Jean-Victor Hocquard on Encyclopedia Universalis
 Hocquard on Flammarion

1910 births
1995 deaths
People from Obernai
20th-century French musicologists